Cephas Malele (born 8 January 1994) is a professional footballer who plays as a forward for Saudi Professional League club Al-Tai.

After starting out as a senior at  FC Zürich II, he went on to appear for teams in Italy, Portugal, Romania and Saudi Arabia.

Born in Angola, Malele represented Switzerland internationally at under-16, under-17, under-18 and under-19 levels.

Club career 
Born in Angola, Malele moved with his family in Switzerland as a child and grew up in the youth system of FC Zürich, also making a couple appearances for their Under-21 reserve side between 2010 and 2011.

During the summer of 2011, he was signed by Palermo and included into their Primavera squad. After a difficult first season due to injuries, Malele became a key player for the main Rosanero youth team throughout the first half of 2012–13 season, pairing with another rising star, Mauro Bollino, and being one of the main topscorers of the Campionato Nazionale Primavera. As a consequence, and also due to lack of strikers in the first team, he was asked by Gian Piero Gasperini to join the senior side, and made his professional Serie A debut on 7 January 2013, playing the final minutes of a league game against Parma. He was featured again on 19 January 2013, playing the final 15 minutes of a home game against Lazio as a replacement to Josip Iličić. He was successively confirmed for the club's triumphal 2013–14 Serie B campaign, where he managed to make only three appearances as a substitute throughout the whole season.

On 28 July 2014, Malele was loaned out to newly promoted Serie B club Virtus Entella for the whole 2014–15 season in order to gain more first team experience.

On 13 August 2021, Malele joined Saudi Arabian club Al-Tai. On 4 August 2022, Malele joined Romanian club CFR Cluj on a season-long loan.

International career
Malele has appeared for Switzerland from the under-15 level to the under-19 level.

Honours
Palermo
Serie B: 2013–14

Individual
Liga I Team of the Season: 2020–21

References

External links

1994 births
Living people
People from Cabinda Province
Naturalised citizens of Switzerland
Swiss people of Angolan descent
Swiss sportspeople of African descent
Association football forwards
Swiss men's footballers
Serie A players
Serie B players
Liga Portugal 2 players
Liga I players
Saudi Professional League players
Palermo F.C. players
Virtus Entella players
Trapani Calcio players
Atlético Clube de Portugal players
Leixões S.C. players
Varzim S.C. players
F.C. Arouca players
U.D. Oliveirense players
FC Argeș Pitești players
Al-Tai FC players
CFR Cluj players
Switzerland youth international footballers
Swiss expatriate footballers
Swiss expatriate sportspeople in Italy
Expatriate footballers in Italy
Swiss expatriate sportspeople in Portugal
Expatriate footballers in Portugal
Swiss expatriate sportspeople in Romania
Expatriate footballers in Romania
Swiss expatriate sportspeople in Saudi Arabia
Expatriate footballers in Saudi Arabia